Marshall B. Broomhall (Chinese: 海恩波; 17 July 1866 – 24 October 1937), was a British Protestant Christian missionary to China with the China Inland Mission. He also authored many books on the subject of Chinese missionary work. He was the most famous son (the fifth of ten children) of the anti-opium trade activist and General Secretary of the CIM Benjamin Broomhall and Amelia Hudson Taylor. Thus he was also the nephew of the founder of the mission, James Hudson Taylor.

Youth in London
In 1875, the Broomhall family, including 9 year old Marshall, moved from Bayswater to Newington Green, London. At Westbourne Grove, where he was born, the family had been members of the Baptist Westbourne Grove Church led by William Garrett Lewis. Marshall's father, Benjamin, then began 20 years of service as the China Inland Mission's general secretary at the London headquarters. In 1887 Marshall went to classical studies at Jesus College, Cambridge. After his graduation (BA) in 1890, he became engaged to Florence Corderoy, the daughter of his father's close friend, John Corderoy. In the same year Marshall was accepted as a missionary by the CIM London Council.

Missionary life
Marshall Broomhall sailed for China on 2 October 1890 on the S.S. Shannon. He attended a year at the CIM's Chinese Language School at Anqing, Anhui, and then he was appointed to the work in Taiyuan, Shanxi. Three of his siblings (Hudson, Marshall and Edith) had all contracted typhus there, but all three recovered.

Marriage and family
Florence Corderoy followed him to China in 1894, but mission regulations required that they could not marry until both had served for two years on the field. Marshall and Florence were finally married on 17 March 1897. They had two children: Honor Irene and Dorothea Broomhall. Marshall had been transferred to Hongdong, Shanxi in 1896, to work with Dixon Edward Hoste, his brother-in-law, and with Gilbert Ritchie, who later married his sister, Edith. The famous Pastor Hsi (Xi Shengmo) had recently died. The area that Marshall worked in was 40 miles north and south, and 70 miles wide. In 1897 there was a church membership of 490 in 17 villages, with 14 opium refuges. The churches were largely self-supporting, led by an ordained native pastor, three elders, and 17 deacons. Broomhall worked here for three years.

Further work and the Boxer Crisis
Florence's poor health necessitated their leaving for Britain in 1899. In 1900, the Boxer Rebellion broke out in China.  The China Inland Mission had the greatest loss of all of the mission agencies; seventy-nine people were massacred, including children.  As the tragedy unfolded and news was cabled to London, Marshall spent days and nights diligently sorting out information gathered from various sources and verifying rumours that were quickly circulating. His hard work led to the compilation of two memorial books that documented the harrowing stories of both the martyrs and the survivors.

Writing and teaching career

That same year Marshall Broomhall had been appointed the Editorial Secretary for the mission in London. This career lasted for 27 years. He also gave preliminary Chinese language lessons to the missionary candidates preparing to go to China.

Marshall became an expert in writing biographies.  He wrote biographies of Hudson Taylor as well as several other members of the China Inland Mission, as well as several books that addressed overall issues and the history of the CIM.  He accomplished much considering his eyesight was impaired at an early age. He did all of his research, writing and editorial work despite being able to see with only one eye.

Marshall took part in the Edinburgh Missionary Conference of 1910. After the 1911/12 founding of the Republic of China he visited China again, and travelled extensively to obtain first-hand and up to date information. He was a member of the commission on "Carrying the Gospel to all the Non-Christian World". In this commission constant reference was made to his important work , and to the statistics in it.

One of Broomhall's particular interests was the conversion of Chinese Muslims to Christianity. To this end, he authored a book, which he believed to be the first book in English on Chinese Muslims.  He called for sending Arabic-speaking missionaries to China, who in his views could work more effectively among the Muslim community.

In 1927 he retired as Editorial Secretary. But he continued to do his literary work.

In 1936, when the Rev. Frank Houghton returned to China to be Bishop of East China, Marshall took over briefly the editorship of China's Millions, but ill health forced his complete withdrawal from the work.

He died on 24 October 1937, aged 71, at Northchurch, England and was buried on 28 October in Abney Park Cemetery, London. Florence Broomhall lived on until 1957.

Notes

Published works
  (see: List of the martyred missionaries of the China Inland Mission in 1900).
 .
 .
 
 .
 
 .
 .
  
 .
 .
 .
 .
 .
 .
 .
 , one of the Cambridge Seven.
 .
 .
 .
 .
  of Emil Fischbacher.
 .
 .

References

Further reading
 Historical Bibliography of the China Inland Mission

External links
 .
  (formerly China Inland Mission and Overseas Missionary Fellowship).
 .

1866 births
1937 deaths
British expatriates in China
British sinologists
Burials at Abney Park Cemetery
Protestant missionaries in China
Protestant writers
English Protestant missionaries
20th-century English historians